The limp eelpout (Melanostigma gelatinosum) is a marine ray-finned fish belonging to the family Zoarcidae, the eelpouts.

References

 
 Tony Ayling & Geoffrey Cox, Collins Guide to the Sea Fishes of New Zealand,  (William Collins Publishers Ltd, Auckland, New Zealand 1982) 

Gymnelinae
Fish described in 1881
Taxa named by Albert Günther